Triplets is an American men's 3-on-3 basketball team that plays in the BIG3. They were the first team announced in the 2019 BIG3 expansion. At the result of the 2019 BIG3 season, the Triplets won the championship over Killer 3's.

2019

Draft

Current roster

References

Big3 teams
Basketball teams established in 2019
2019 establishments in the United States